Beerland is a television series about beer broadcast by Viceland starring Meg Gill.

See also

 List of programs broadcast by Vice on TV

References

External links
 
 
 

2017 American television series debuts
2018 American television series endings
English-language television shows
Food and drink television series
Viceland original programming
Works about beer